Yesshows is the second live album by the English progressive rock band Yes. It was released in November 1980 on Atlantic Records as the final album before the group disbanded in early 1981. Their first live album in seven years, it is compiled of recordings from their 1976, 1977, and 1978 tours from dates in North America and Europe with its mixing supervised by bassist Chris Squire.

Yesshows was remastered and expanded in 2009 by Isao Kikuchi, and published by Warner Music Japan as part of their "Yes SHM-CD Papersleeve" series.

Background and production
In June 1979, the Yes line-up of singer Jon Anderson, bassist Chris Squire, guitarist Steve Howe, keyboardist Rick Wakeman, and drummer Alan White, finished their 1978–1979 tour in support of the band's ninth studio album, Tormato (1978). Their label Atlantic Records had approached the group about the possibility of putting out a live album as a follow-up to their first, Yessongs (1973), and Squire had the task of sifting through hours of tapes of concerts recorded since then and select the best cuts. He also undertook mixing duties, and prepared a selection of tracks from the 1976, 1977, and 1978 tours across five dates from his studio, Sun Park Studios.

The band commissioned longtime cover artist Roger Dean to produce artwork for the album, which was completed using acrylic paints and collage. A release date of Christmas 1979 was set, but it was shelved following disagreements from other band members regarding Squire's choice of performances and the quality of his mixes. Howe was glad that production had halted and "strongly objected" to some of the production edits that Squire had done. He expressed the rest of the band's wish to refine the recordings further and to add more tracks to expand the set from a double to a triple album.

By mid-1980, Yes had a change in personnel following the departures of Anderson and Wakeman, and the remaining members recruited Trevor Horn and Geoff Downes of The Buggles as replacements on vocals and keyboards, respectively. The five recorded Drama (1980), and toured the album from August to December 1980. Towards the end of that year, Atlantic Records wished to release a live album and used the cuts and mixes that Squire had prepared as the final release. Mastering was completed at Strawberry Mastering.

Songs
Yesshows comprises seven songs taken from five concerts. "The Gates of Delirium" and "Ritual" are from 17 August 1976 at Cobo Hall in Detroit, Michigan, during the band's 1976 North American tour. "Parallels", "Going for the One", and "Wonderous Stories" were recorded on 24 November 1977 at Ahoy-Hal in Rotterdam during the 1977 tour in support of Going for the One (1977). "Time and a Word" and "Don't Kill the Whale" are from the Wembley Arena in Wembley, London from the Tormato tour. The latter was recorded by the BBC using the Manor Mobile studio for a live radio broadcast of 28 October 1978 concert.

Release
Yesshows was released in November 1980; it was released in the US on 24 November 1980. It did not enter the UK Albums Chart until 10 January 1981 when it reached No. 29. In its third week, it reached its peak at No. 22, and remained on the chart for five more weeks. In the US, the album peaked at No. 43 on the Billboard 200 on 31 January 1981, during a 12-week stay on the chart.

Reception

Band opinion of this second live album by Yes was divided, at least up to the 1990s.  As reported by author David Watkinson, the label did not inform everyone of events. Wakeman, who was not in the group at the time of release, said that Squire's mixes were "good but nothing exciting. The next thing I know was that somebody gave me a copy". While he, Anderson, and Howe did not care for the final release, Moraz, White, and Squire gave it more approval.

Writing for Sounds magazine in late 1980, John Gill recommended, "For Delirium and Ritual alone, I'd buy it". The UCLA Daily Bruin perhaps spoke for many fans of the time when it stated, "The inclusion of 'Gates of Delirium' and 'Ritual' are enough to justify the existence of Yesshows" but the review also noted that with Anderson and Wakeman recently exiting the group (and the Buggles merging in), an opportunity was missed to include old high-rated classics.  It called the inclusion of "Don't Kill The Whale" a "worthy message, but not a particularly good Yes song".

Reissues

Track listing

2009 CD

Personnel
Credits are taken from the 1980 and 1994 liner notes.

Yes
Jon Anderson – lead vocals, guitar, keyboards on "Don't Kill the Whale"
Steve Howe – electric and acoustic guitars, backing vocals
Chris Squire – bass guitar, backing vocals, percussion on "Ritual"
Patrick Moraz – keyboards on "The Gates of Delirium" and "Ritual"
Rick Wakeman – keyboards on all other tracks
Alan White – drums, percussion

Production
Chris Squire – production, mixing
Mike Dunne – live recording
Nigel Luby – live recording engineer
Geoff Young – engineer
Sean Davis – engineer on "Time and a Word"
Barry Ainsworth – engineer on "Time and a Word"
Tony Wilson – production on "Don't Kill the Whale"
Bill Aitken – engineer on "Don't Kill the Whale"
Neil Burn – engineer on "Don't Kill the Whale"
Roger Dean – cover painting
Magnetic Storm Ltd. – cover design
Sean Davis – lacquer cut
Lisa Tanner – photography

Chart performance

Certifications

References

Sources

Yes (band) live albums
Albums with cover art by Roger Dean (artist)
1980 live albums
Atlantic Records live albums